Grace Min was the defending champion, but lost to Alexandra Stevenson in the first round.

Fourth seed Louisa Chirico won the title, defeating wildcard Katerina Stewart in an all-American final, 7–6(7–1), 3–6, 7–6(7–1).

Seeds

Main draw

Finals

Top half

Bottom half

References 
 Main draw

Hardee's Pro Classic - Singles
Hardee's Pro Classic